

See also
 Northern Indiana Conference

Indiana High School Athletic Association